Kilpyavr (Russian: Килпъявр or Килп-Явр, Finnish: Kilpijärvi. Also appearing in many different forms as Kilpajärvi, Kilp-Yavr, Kil'p-Yar, Kilp-Yar, Kilpyarvi) is a former military air base in Murmansk Oblast, Russia located 30 km northwest of Murmansk.  It was a small interceptor base operated by the 941st Fighter Aviation Regiment (941 IAP).

Kilpyavr's interceptor regiment initially operated the Sukhoi Su-9 (NATO: Fishpot) in the 1960s and 1970s.  This aircraft was replaced in 1978 with the Mikoyan-Gurevich MiG-23M (NATO: Flogger-B).  Kilpyavr also operated the Mikoyan-Gurevich MiG-19 (NATO: Farmer), and upgraded to Sukhoi Su-27 (NATO: Flanker) aircraft in 1985.

References

External links

Michael Holm, 941st Fighter Aviation Regiment PVO

Russian Air Force bases
Soviet Air Force bases
Soviet Air Defence Force bases
Airports in Murmansk Oblast